Rizhao railway station is a railway station in Donggang District, Rizhao, Shandong, China.

The station is the eastern terminus for passenger services of Yanzhou–Shijiusuo railway, however the line continues east to the Rizhao Port.

The railway station is due to be rebuilt and expanded.

See also
Rizhao West railway station

References

Railway stations in Shandong